Leapfrog is a children's game.

Leapfrog or leap-frog may also refer to:
Leap-Frog (comics), two comic book characters in Marvel Comics
Leapfrog (comics), a vehicle appearing in Marvel Comics
Leap Frog (board game)
Leap Frogs, the United States Navy Parachute Team
Leapfrogging, a theory of economic development
Leapfrogging (infantry), an infantry tactic for advancing towards an enemy position
Leapfrogging (strategy), a military strategy, also called island hopping
Leapfrogging (urban development), a theory of urban economics/planning
LeapFrog Enterprises, an educational toy company
Leapfrog Group, a patient safety organization that grades hospitals based on a set of safety criteria
Leapfrog integration, a method for integrating differential equations
Leapfrog position, a sexual position
"Leapfrog", the theme song of Les Brown
IBM Leapfrog, a prototype tablet computer